Ranunculus repens, the creeping buttercup, is a flowering plant in the buttercup family Ranunculaceae, native to Europe, Asia and northwestern Africa. It is also called creeping crowfoot and (along with restharrow) sitfast.

Description
It has both prostrate running stems, which produce roots and new plants at the nodes, and more or less erect flowering stems. The leaves higher on the stems are smaller, with narrower leaflets and may be simple and lanceolate. Both the stems and the leaves are finely hairy. The flowers are golden yellow, glossy, and  diameter, usually with five petals, and the flower stem is finely grooved. The gloss is caused by the smooth upper surface of the petal that acts like a mirror; the gloss aids in attracting pollinating insects and thermoregulation of the flower's reproductive organs. Creeping buttercup has three-lobed dark green, white-spotted leaves that grow out of the node. It grows in fields and pastures and prefers wet soil.

Habitat
It is a very common weed of agricultural land and gardens, spreading quickly by its rooting stolons and resisting removal with a deeply anchored filamentous root ball. In Ireland: very common in damp places, ditches and flooded areas.

Cultivation and uses
Creeping buttercup was sold in many parts of the world as an ornamental plant, and has now become an invasive species in many parts of the world.

Like most buttercups, Ranunculus repens is poisonous, although when dried with hay these poisons are lost. The taste of buttercups is acrid, so cattle avoid eating them. The plants then take advantage of the cropped ground around it to spread their stolons. Creeping buttercup also is spread through the transportation of hay. Contact with the sap of the plant can cause skin blistering.

Etymology
Ranunculus is a diminutive of 'rana', meaning 'little frog'. This name is in reference to the amphibious habitat of many Ranunculus species.

Repens means 'creeping' or 'stoloniferous'.

References

External links
 

repens
Flora of Africa
Flora of Asia
Flora of Europe
Medicinal plants
Plants described in 1753
Taxa named by Carl Linnaeus
Poisonous plants